Purl Kenneth Keen (born July 1952) is a retired United States Army officer. He last served as the commander of the Office of the Defense Representative, U.S. Embassy Pakistan and before that served as Military Deputy Commander of United States Southern Command.

Early life and education
Keen is a native of Hyden, Kentucky. He graduated from Eastern Kentucky University in 1974 with a Bachelor of Science in mathematics.  He later earned a Master of Arts in Latin American studies from the University of Florida. Keen also studied at the Brazilian Army Command and General Staff College and the United States Army War College.

Military career
An Infantry officer with 18 years on airborne status, Keen has commanded Light Airborne Infantry, Ranger, Special Forces, Military Group and Army Component units. His commands include a Special Forces Detachment (SCUBA) in 3rd Battalion, 7th Special Forces Group; Company and Battalion Commands in the 82nd Airborne Division; Command of 1st Battalion, 75th Ranger Regiment; Command of the 75th Ranger Regiment; Command of United States Military Group Bogota, Colombia; Command of United States Army South (USARSO); and Command of Joint Task Force Haiti – Operation Unified Response.

Keen participated in Operation Just Cause as the Assistant S3 of the 75th Ranger Regiment and was Commander, Ranger Task Force during Operation Desert Storm as part of Joint Special Operations Command.

From September 2007 to September 2009, he served as the Director of the United States European Command Plans and Operations Center and the EUCOM Chief of Staff.

Keen is now a professor and the Associate Dean of Leadership Development at Emory University's Goizueta School of Business in Atlanta, Georgia.

Awards and decorations

References

External links

U.S. Southern Command biography

Living people
People from Hyden, Kentucky
Eastern Kentucky University alumni
Recipients of the Distinguished Service Medal (US Army)
Recipients of the Legion of Merit
Recipients of the Defense Superior Service Medal
Colonels of the 75th Ranger Regiment
United States Army generals
1952 births